Cafarsite (·)
is a rare calcium iron arsenite mineral. Manganese and titanium occur with iron in the formula.

It was first described in 1966 for an occurrence in the Binn Valley, Valais, Switzerland. Its name is from the composition, calcium, ferrum (iron), and arsenic. It has also been reported from Piedmont, Italy and the Hemlo gold mine in the Thunder Bay District, Ontario, Canada.

References

Oxide minerals
Cubic minerals
Minerals in space group 201
Minerals described in 1966